is a 2006 film directed by Takashi Miike. The film premiered at the 56th Berlin International Film Festival in February 2006.

Plot
In an unknown future, Jun confesses to the murder of another boy, Shiro, at an all-boy juvenile detention facility. The story follows two detectives trying to uncover the case through interviews and intersperses testimonies by the inmates and the prison employees with events in the lives of Jun and Shiro.  Jun, who is incarcerated for the murder of his rapist, forms an intensely close bond with Shiro, who is in prison for a murder and the rape of a woman.  Shiro protects Jun with fanatical intensity and violence from the other boys, though his intentions toward Jun are not clear.  The highly symbolic visuals and dialogue contrast with the routine nature of the police investigation, creating a somewhat surreal commentary on the nature of violence and salvation throughout the film.

Cast
Ryuhei Matsuda as Jun
Masanobu Andō as Shiro
Shunsuke Kubozuka
Kiyohiko Shibukawa
Jo Kanamori
Kenichi Endō
Renji Ishibashi
Ryo Ishibashi
Shirō Kazuki
Jai West as Deranged prisoner

References

External links 
 
 
 

2006 films
2000s prison films
Films about murder
Films about murderers
Films directed by Takashi Miike
2000s Japanese-language films
Japanese LGBT-related films
Gay-related films
Japanese prison films
2000s Japanese films